This is a list of notable Virginia Tech alumni.

Military
Virginia Tech and its Corps of Cadets have a long tradition of providing service to the military.  Seven Medal of Honor recipients are alumni or former cadets at Virginia Tech.

LTG William G. Boykin, US Army (Class of 1971) – Deputy Under Secretary of Defense for Intelligence; commanding general, John F. Kennedy Special Warfare Center and School; commanding general, 1st Special Forces Command (Airborne); commander, 1st SFOD-D
VADM Jody A. Breckenridge, USCG (Class of 1975) – Commander Coast Guard Pacific Area
RADM J. Scott Burhoe, USCG (Class of 1976) – 39th Superintendent of the U.S. Coast Guard Academy; 10th president of Fork Union Military Academy
GEN Carlton D. Everhart II, USAF (Class of 1983) – commander, Air Mobility Command
2LT Robert E. Femoyer, USAAF (Class of 1944) – awarded the Medal of Honor for actions as an Army Air Force B-17 Flying Fortress navigator on a bombing mission over Germany
COL Julien E. Gaujot, US Army (Class of 1893) – awarded the Medal of Honor for actions on the Mexican border in 1914, the only soldier ever awarded the Medal for actions of a peacekeeping nature; brother of Antoine Gaujot (did not graduate)
LTC Antoine A.M. Gaujot, US Army (Class of 1900) – awarded the Medal of Honor for actions as an Army Corporal at the Battle of San Mateo during the Philippine–American War; brother of Julien Gaujot (did not graduate)
SGT Earle D. Gregory, US Army (Class of 1923) – awarded the Medal of Honor for his actions in the Meuse-Argonne Offensive during World War I; known as the "Sgt. York of Virginia"
Nidal Hasan, US Army (Class of 1997) – former MAJ and Army psychiatrist; convicted in the 2009 Fort Hood shooting, subsequently dishonorably discharged
LTG Joseph R. Inge, US Army (Class of 1969) – deputy commander, United States Northern Command; vice commander, U.S. Element, North American Aerospace Defense Command
1LT Jimmie W. Monteith, Jr., US Army (Class of 1944) – awarded the Medal of Honor for his actions during the Normandy landings on D-Day during World War II (did not graduate)
LTG Lewis A. Pick, US Army (Class of 1914)
GEN Thomas C. Richards, USAF (Class of 1956) – administrator of the Federal Aviation Administration; deputy commander in chief, U.S. European Command; Commandant of cadets, U.S. Air Force Academy
LTG Wallace H. Robinson, USMC (Class of 1940) – 20th Quartermaster General of the Marine Corps; director of the Defense Supply Agency
1LT Richard Thomas Shea, US Army (Class of 1948) – awarded the Medal of Honor for his actions at the Battle of Pork Chop Hill during the Korean War (did not graduate)
GEN Lance L. Smith, USAF (Class of 1969) – commander, U.S. Joint Forces Command and NATO Supreme Allied Commander for Transformation and deputy commander, U.S. Central Command
SGT Herbert J. Thomas, USMC (Class of 1944) – awarded the Medal of Honor for his actions on Bougainville Island during World War II; member of Virginia Tech's Athletic Hall of Fame (did not graduate)
CPT James F. Van Pelt Jr., USAAF (Class of 1940) – B-29 Superfortress navigator involved in both atomic bomb attacks against Japan, navigating the instrument ship in the first attack against Hiroshima, then navigating the aircraft that dropped the atomic bomb on Nagasaki
MAJ Lloyd W. Williams, USMC (Class of 1907) – attributed with one of the more famous quotes of World War I: "Retreat? Hell! We just got here!"

Academia
Belinda C. Anderson (Class of 1986, Ed.D.) – 11th president of Virginia Union University
Markus Breitschmid (Class of 1994, M.S.) – internationally active Swiss architectural theoretician, historian, and author
Julian Ashby Burruss (Class of 1898) – first president of Normal and Industrial School for Women (now James Madison University); eighth president of Virginia Polytechnic Institute and State University
Bill Dally (Class of 1979, BS) – American Computer scientist and Professor of Electrical Engineering at Stanford University
Thomas DiLorenzo – Austrian School economist and author; professor at Loyola University in Baltimore (Ph.D. in economics)
Edwin D. Harrison (1948 M.S.) – sixth president of the Georgia Institute of Technology
Paige Kassalen (Class of 2015, B.S.) – American electrical engineer who was the only American, female engineer, and youngest member of the ground crew for the Solar Impulse 2 project.
Robert C. Michelson (Class of 1973) – roboticist; progenitor of the field of aerial robotics; recipient of the 2001 Pirelli Award
Richard Mines (Class of 1983) environmental engineer; Emeritus Professor of Environmental and Civil Engineering at Mercer University
Enid Montague (2008, Ph.D.) – director of the Wellness and Health Enhancement Engineering Laboratory at DePaul University
Robert Coleman Richardson (1958 BS; 1960 MS) – physicist at Cornell University; shared the Nobel Prize in Physics in 1996 for the discovery of superfluidity in He-3
Mark Embree (Class of 1996) – Rhodes Scholar; professor of mathematics at Virginia Tech;Leader of the Computational Modeling and Data Analytics (CMDA) department at Virginia Tech
Linwood H. Rose (1973) – fifth president of James Madison University
Charles W. Steger (1969) – 15th president of Virginia Polytechnic Institute and State University
William M. Clemons (Class of 1995 B.S.) – professor of biochemistry at California Institute of Technology

Business and government
Phil Agcaoili (attended in 1989) – business leader and information security expert
J. Lindsay Almond, Jr. – Member of the US House of Representatives from Virginia's 6th District (1945–1948), 26th Attorney General of Virginia (1948–1957), 58th Governor of Virginia (1958–1962), associate judge of the United States Court of Customs and Patent Appeals (1962–1973)
Richard Baker (Class of 1998) – game designer
Steve Bannon (Class of 1976) – former executive chairman of Breitbart News and White House Chief Strategist for U.S.President Donald Trump
William K. Barlow (1958) – member of the Virginia House of Delegates, representing the 64th District (1992–2011)
Brett Blanton – 12th Architect of the Capitol
Andrew S. Boutros (2001) – attorney best known for prosecuting Silk Road
Donaldson Brown (Class of 1902) – financial executive and corporate director with DuPont and General Motors
Jim Buckmaster – CEO of Craigslist
Dave Calhoun – president and CEO of Boeing former global head of Private Equity, Blackstone Group; former CEO and chairman of the board, Nielsen Holdings
Charles J. Camarda (Class of 1983, Ph.D.) – astronaut on board the space shuttle Discovery for the STS-114 mission
Jess Cliffe – game designer; co-creator of Counter-Strike
 James Cook – senior vice president of The U.S. Russia Investment Fund (TUSRIF) and Delta Capital Management; co-founder of Aurora Russia Limited
Roger K. Crouch (1968 M.S.; 1971 Ph.D.) – NASA astronaut
Chet Culver – former governor of Iowa (2007–2011); former Iowa Secretary of State (1999–2007)
Joseph DeSimone (1990 Ph.D.) – co-founder and CEO of Carbon
William Dodd (1895 B.S.; 1897 M.S.) – ambassador to Germany, 1933–1937, under President Roosevelt; subject of Erik Larson's book In the Garden of Beasts: Love, Terror, and an American Family in Hitler's Berlin
Frank Dunham, Jr. – lead lawyer for Zacarias Moussaoui
 Regina E. Dugan (1984 B.S., Class of 1985 M.S.) – former vice president of Engineering, Facebook Inc.; former vice president of Advanced Technology and Projects at Google also known as the "Moonshot" project; 19th Director of the Defense Advanced Research Projects Agency – the first woman to lead the agency
James Dunsmuir (attended VAMC in 1874) – British Columbia coal magnate and politician
Clifton C. Garvin (1943 B.S.; 1947 M.S.) – chairman and CEO of Exxon Corp.
Henry C. Groseclose – considered to be the father of the Future Farmers of America organization
Deborah Hersman – chairman, U.S. National Transportation Safety Board
Duff Holbrook – wildlife biologist and forester (United States Forest Service); reintroduced wild turkeys to much of South Carolina
Lawrence L. Koontz, Jr. (Class of 1962) – justice, Supreme Court of Virginia
Chris Kraft (Class of 1944) – NASA architect of Mission Control and its first flight director; author of Flight: My Life in Mission Control
Newton Lee (1984 B.S.; 1985 M.S.) – Computer scientist, author, futurist, and chairman of the California Transhumanist Party.
Matt Lohr (Class of 1995) – delegate, Virginia House of Delegates
 Letitia Long (Class of 1982) – director of the National Geospatial-Intelligence Agency (2010–2014); first woman in charge of a major U.S. intelligence agency
Lillian M. Lowery (Class of 2004) – superintendent, Maryland State Department of Education
Bashar Masri – Businessman, Billionaire
Tony McNulty – Minister for Police and Security in the UK government
Mike Michalowicz (Class of 1993) – author of business books and former columnist for The Wall Street Journal; MSNBC television personality. Co-captain of Virginia Tech Men's Lacrosse Team 1993.
Elsa Murano – 23rd president of Texas A&M University; former Under Secretary of Agriculture for Food Safety
Ajay Nanavati, former head of 3M India and current chairman of Syndicate Bank
Howard J. Osborn, former Director of Security at the CIA
Robert B. Pamplin, Sr. (Class of 1933) – CEO of Georgia Pacific Corp.
Robert B. Pamplin, Jr. (attended in the 1960s) – president and CEO of R.B. Pamplin Corporation
Jim Pyne (Class of 1993) – NFL football player, All-American, co-founder of Wheels Up
Thomas M. Price (Class of 1938) – architect
Alan H. Shaw - CEO of Norfolk Southern
Frank Sturgis, born Frank Angelo Fiorini (attended in the 1940s) – convicted for the Watergate burglaries that ultimately led to the resignation of US President Richard M. Nixon; served in the US Marines, Navy, and Army and as a covert operative in Latin America
Linda Swartz Taglialatela – United States Ambassador to Barbados, the Eastern Caribbean and the OECS
John H. Thompson (1973, B.S.; 1975 M.S.) – director of the United States Census Bureau
Harrison Ruffin Tyler (Class of 1951) - chemical engineer and co-founder of ChemTreat, Inc. 
Joseph F. Ware, Jr. – Department Manager of Engineering Flight Test for the Lockheed U-2 and the SR-71 Blackbird
Rob Wittman – Member of the U.S. House of Representatives from Virginia's 1st District
Catherine Woteki (Class of 1971, M.S., Ph.D.) – Under Secretary for USDA's Research, Education, and Economics mission area, as well as the department's chief scientist
George Nolen (Class of 1978) – CEO, Siemens USA from 2003 to 2009 and CEO, Filtration Group Corporation from 2017 to 2019
Caitlin Rivers (Class of 2015, PhD) – assistant professor at Johns Hopkins Bloomberg School of Public Health and senior scholar at the Johns Hopkins Center for Health Security

Literature
Kwame Alexander – writer of children's literature
Kathleen Ann Goonan (Class of 1974) – science fiction writer
Homer Hickam (Class of 1964) – author
Vahan Janjigian (1982 MBA, 1985 Ph.D.) – non-fiction author
Sharyn McCrumb (Class of 1985) – author
Mike Michalowicz (Class of 1993) – author of business books
Tijan Sallah (class of 1984, MA and 1987, PhD, economics) – author, literary critic

Movies and television
Roger Craig (Class of 1999) – winner of the 2011 Jeopardy! Tournament of Champions
Sara Erikson – TV actress
Azita Ghanizada – actress
Hoda Kotb (Class of 1986) – television news anchor, TV host, and long-time anchor of NBC's Today
Tim Leaton (Class of 2007) – filmmaker, editor
Molly Line (Class of 1999) – reporter for Fox News
Brian Sullivan (Class of 1993) – CNBC anchor
Collette Wolfe – film actress
Camille Schrier (Class of 2018) – Miss America 2020

Music
 Gerry Beckley – founding member of the rock band America
 Keith Buckley – singer for metalcore band Every Time I Die
 Charlie Byrd (Class of 1946) – jazz guitarist
 Jack Tatum – also known as Wild Nothing, pop
Bobbie Allen – also known as Young Summer, singer/songwriter

Sports

Australian Rules Football
Peggy O'Neill – president, the Richmond Football Club

Auto racing
Darian Grubb (Class of 1998) – NASCAR technical director for Hendrick Motorsports
Brian Whitesell (Class of 1987) – NASCAR team manager for Hendrick Motorsports

Baseball
Kevin Barker – first baseman, Toronto Blue Jays
George Canale – former Milwaukee Brewers first baseman
Brad Clontz – former Atlanta Braves pitcher
Johnny Oates – catcher and later manager for the Baltimore Orioles; manager of the Texas Rangers
Chad Pinder – utility player, Oakland Athletics
Joe Saunders – pitcher, Baltimore Orioles
Franklin Stubbs – former Major League first baseman-outfielder
Mike Williams – former Major League pitcher
Brian Fitzgerald – former Major League pitcher, Seattle Mariners
Erik Neander – general manager Tampa Bay Rays
 Al Richter, former Major League Baseball player, Boston Red Sox
Mark Zagunis- outfielder, Chicago Cubs
Joe Mantiply – pitcher, Arizona Diamondbacks
Packy Naughton – pitcher, St. Louis Cardinals

Basketball
Nickeil Alexander-Walker (attended) – point guard for the Utah Jazz and cousin of Oklahoma City Thunder player Shai Gilgeous-Alexander
Jeff Allen (Class of 2011) – power forward/center for Hapoel Be'er Sheva of the Liga Leumit
 Kerry Blackshear Jr. (born 1997), basketball player in the Israeli Basketball Premier League
Allan Bristow (Class of 1974) – forward/guard for the Philadelphia 76ers, San Antonio Spurs, Utah Jazz, and Dallas Mavericks; coach of the Charlotte Hornets; executive for the New Orleans Hornets
Vernell "Bimbo" Coles (Class of 1990) – point guard with the 1988 U.S. Olympic Basketball team, Miami Heat, Golden State Warriors, Atlanta Hawks, Cleveland Cavaliers, and Boston Celtics
Dell Curry (Class of 1986) – former shooting guard for the Utah Jazz, Cleveland Cavaliers, Charlotte Hornets, and father of NBA star Stephen Curry
 Malcolm Delaney (Class of 2011) – guard for the Atlanta Hawks for 2016–17 NBA season
Zabian Dowdell (Class of 2007) – point guard for Enisey Krasnoyarsk of the Russian Professional Basketball League and Phoenix Suns
 Erick Green (born 1991) - basketball player in the Israeli Basketball Premier League
Jalen Hudson (born 1996) - basketball player in the Israeli Basketball Premier League
Paul Long (Class of 1967) – guard for the Detroit Pistons, Buffalo Braves, and Kentucky Colonels 
Justin Robinson (Class of 2019) – point guard for the Delaware Blue Coats
Adam Smith (born 1992) - guard for Hapoel Holon in the Israel Basketball Premier League
Deron Washington (Class of 2008) – small forward/shooting guard for the Barak Netanya of the Israeli Basketball Super League; selected 59th overall in the 2008 NBA draft

Cheerleading
 Kylene Barker – Miss America 1979
 Curtis Dvorak – Jacksonville Jaguars mascot, Jaxson de Ville

Football
James Anderson – linebacker for the Chicago Bears
Bruce Arians – former head coach of the NFL's Arizona Cardinals and Tampa Bay Buccaneers

Frank Beamer (Class of 1969) – head coach of the Virginia Tech football team 1986 to 2015
Ken Barefoot (Class of 1968) – Tight End – East West Shrine Bowl, Senior Bowl, 4th pick by the Washington Redskins in the 1968 NFL Draft
Rashad Carmichael – cornerback for the Houston Texans
C. Hunter Carpenter (Class of 1902) – first Virginia Tech player elected to the National Football Hall of Fame
Kam Chancellor – safety for the Seattle Seahawks; Super Bowl XLVIII Champion
David Clowney – wide receiver for the New York Jets
Carroll Dale (Class of 1964) – former wide receiver, All-American, played for Vince Lombardi-era Green Bay Packers
André Davis – wide receiver for the Houston Texans
Jim Druckenmiller (Class of 1996) – former quarterback for the San Francisco 49ers and Miami Dolphins; 26th pick in the 1997 NFL Draft
Bill Ellenbogen – offensive lineman for the New York Giants
John Engelberger – former defensive end for the Denver Broncos 
Tremaine Edmunds – NFL Player for Buffalo Bills
Terrell Edmunds – NFL Player for Pittsburgh Steelers
Antone Exum (Class of 2014) – cornerback for the Minnesota Vikings
Michel Faulkner – All-American at Virginia Tech; played for New York Jets in 1981–1982
Brandon Flowers – defensive back for the San Diego Chargers; selected by the Kansas City Chiefs with the 35th overall pick in the 2008 NFL Draft
Antonio Freeman (Class of 1995) – former wide receiver for the Green Bay Packers; played in Super Bowl XXXI, Super Bowl XXXII, and 1998 Pro Bowl
Kendall Fuller – cornerback of the Washington Football Team; 84th pick of the 2016 NFL Draft(did not graduate)
Kyle Fuller (Class of 2014) – cornerback for the Chicago Bears; 14th pick of the 2014 NFL Draft
Vincent Fuller – safety for the Tennessee Titans; 108th pick in the 2005 NFL Draft
Shayne Graham (Class of 2000) – NFL place-kicker
Jake Grove (Class of 2004) – center for the Miami Dolphins, All-American 2nd round draft pick in 2004 NFL Draft
DeAngelo Hall (Class of 2005) – defensive back for the Washington Redskins;, 8th overall pick at the 2004 NFL Draft and played in consecutive Pro-Bowls in 2006–2007 (did not graduate)
Michael Hawkes – football player
Vaughn Hebron – running back/kick returner for the Denver Broncos; played in Super Bowl XXXII Antonio Freeman), Super Bowl XXXIII; two-time Pro Bowler
Jayron Hosley – cornerback for the New York Giants
Mike Johnson – linebacker for the Cleveland Browns, Detroit Lions and Canadian Football League teams; All-Pro and Pro Bowl; voted one of the top 100 Browns in history.
Steve Johnson – tight end for the New England Patriots
Kevin Jones – running back for the Chicago Bears; 1st Round, 30th overall pick at the 2004 NFL Draft
Jeff King – tight end for the Carolina Panthers
Jonathan Lewis (Class of 2006) – defensive tackle for the Jacksonville Jaguars; selected with the 177th overall pick in the 2006 NFL Draft
Frank Loria – first Team All-American safety for VT (1967); first Team Academic All-American (1967); College Football Hall of Fame member (1999); was defensive backs coach for Marshall (age 23) when he and the team were killed in a plane crash (1970)
Josh Morgan – wide receiver for the Chicago Bears; had stints with the San Francisco 49ers and the Washington Redskins
Ken Oxendine – running back for the Atlanta Falcons
Rick Razzano – linebacker for the Cincinnati Bengals and Toronto Argonauts
George Roberts – NFL punter
Aaron Rouse (Class of 2007) – safety for the New York Giants
Eddie Royal – current wide receiver for the Chicago Bears; drafted by the Denver Broncos with the 42nd overall pick in the 2008 NFL Draft
Damien Russell – defensive back for the San Francisco 49ers
Joey Slye – (Class of 2018) current Kicker for the Carolina Panthers. 
Bruce Smith (Class of 1985) – defensive linesman for the Buffalo Bills and Washington Redskins; All-American and first overall pick at the 1985 NFL Draft; 2009 Pro Football Hall of Fame inductee
Don Strock – quarterback for Miami Dolphins and Cleveland Browns; later a college head coach
Darryl Tapp – defensive end for the Detroit Lions, selected by the Seattle Seahawks with the 63rd overall pick at the 2006 NFL Draft
Tyrod Taylor (Class of 2011) – starting quarterback for the Cleveland Browns; Super Bowl XLVII Champion
Logan Thomas (Class of 2014) – quarterback for the Miami Dolphins, Tight End for the Washington Football Team
Michael Vick – quarterback for the Pittsburgh Steelers, first overall pick at the 2001 NFL Draft by the Atlanta Falcons (did not graduate)
Ernest Wilford – wide receiver for the Miami Dolphins, selected with the 24th pick of the 4th round in the 2004 NFL Draft
Ryan Williams – running back for the Arizona Cardinals
David Wilson (Class of 2012) – running back for the New York Giants; 1st Round pick at the 2012 NFL Draft (did not graduate)
Jason Worilds (Class of 2010) – outside linebacker for the Pittsburgh Steelers, selected with 52nd overall pick in the 2010 NFL Draft

Golf
 Brendon de Jonge – PGA Tour golfer, 2008 Nationwide Tour Player of the Year
 Johnson Wagner – PGA Tour golfer, three-time winner
 Drew Weaver (Class of 2009) – PGA Tour golfer, winner of the 2007 British Amateur

Softball
 Angela Tincher – 2008 USA Softball Collegiate Player of the Year

Track & field
 Kristi Castlin (Class of 2010) – 2016 Rio Olympics, Bronze Medal 100M hurdles
 Queen Harrison – three-time NCAA women's national champion in the 60 m, 100 m and 400 m hurdles; 2008 US Olympian in the 400 m hurdles; won the 2010 Bowerman, the "Heisman of Track and Field"
 Marcel Lomnicky – 2009 NCAA men's national champion in the hammer throw

Wrestling
 Jim Miller – wrestled for Virginia Tech as a freshman walk-on during the 2002–2003 season; professional MMA fighter
Adam Page – professional wrestler

Other
 Ken Pomeroy – college basketball statistical specialist
 Zain Naghmi – professional esports player

See also
 Virginia Tech commencement speakers

References
Unless otherwise noted, references are contained in the Wiki articles on individuals.

External links
 Virginia Tech Alumni Association
 Virginia Tech Alumni Association | Notable Virginia Tech alumni

Virginia Tech alumni